Manish Raisinghan (born 22 July) is an Indian television actor known for his portrayals of Sameer Gheewala in Teen Bahuraniyaan and Siddhant Bharadwaj in Sasural Simar Ka.

Career
Raisinghan played the character of Siddhant  Bharadwaj in Colors TV's show Sasural Simar Ka.  He recently had a friendly appearance as a film star in Madhur Bhandarkar's film Heroine.

After a long gap of 5 year, in August 2022 he made a comeback with Colors TV's Nima Denzongpa where he replaced Mohammed Iqbal Khan as Virat Sethi.

Filmography

Heroine - guest Appearance
Kahani Rubberband Ki - Hero

Short films

Almost 2016 director Producer Director of photography Editor

Ankahee Baatein 2016 Actor

When I Met Myself 2016 Creative director Cinematographer

Toh Mera Galat He Sahi Hai 2016 director Director of photography Editor Producer

I Me Myself director Director of photography Editor Producer Actor VFX

Now U Listen Director Writer Producer

Television

Awards

 2015 Indian Television Academy Awards Rishtey-Naate Award

References

External links
 Official Twitter

Sindhi people
1979 births
Living people
Indian male television actors
Indian male models
Indian male soap opera actors